Meike Babel and Laurence Courtois won in the final 6–0, 6–2 against Åsa Carlsson and Florencia Labat in the doubles of the 1998 ENKA Open.

Seeds
Champion seeds are indicated in bold text while text in italics indicates the round in which those seeds were eliminated.

 Sabine Appelmans /  Els Callens (quarterfinals)
 Meike Babel /  Laurence Courtois (champions)
 Radka Bobková /  Caroline Schneider (first round)
 Olga Barabanschikova /  Tina Križan (quarterfinals)

Draw

External links
 1998 ENKA Open Doubles Draw

ENKA Open
1998 WTA Tour